Surf Style is a surf-style clothing and souvenir retail chain in Florida, Alabama, and Mississippi operated by Surf Style Retail Management. Surf Style has about 40 retail locations and is also an internet retailer. Their Clearwater Beach superstore includes a FlowRider indoor surfing and boogie boarding installation. Surf Style also carries its own line of branded apparel.

History
Surf Style began with windbreaker sales out of a car trunk. A wholesale clothing business followed and retail stores were eventually developed.

In 2000, the Gus Stevens building at US 90 and Veterans Avenue in Biloxi, Mississippi was slated for conversion into a Surf Style store. The location was a famous nightclub in the 1950s and 1960s and best known as the last place where Jayne Mansfield performed prior to her death.

The Platinum Dolls and former stripper turned suburban housewife and murderer, Marjorie Orbin modeled for Surf Style for four years.

The Clearwater Beach location at 311 South Gulfview Blvd. was slated for reconstruction in 2010, to include 31,000 square feet of space, adjoining restaurant space for Britt's Laguna Grill, and 349 space parking garage. A delay was requested due to the BP oil spill. In 2011, Surf Style opened the new $11 million superstore. A 300-space parking garage was also built adjacent to the superstore, in part to offset spaces lost when the beach's Gulf Walk enhancements were constructed.

There was a dispute with the City of Clearwater over outdoor displays at its superstore on Clearwater Beach. Also in 2011, Surf Style was sued by Abercrombie & Fitch for  trademark infringement over use of a seagull image.

In 2013 the company partnered with Guy Harvey.

Offerings
The beachwear sold at Surf Style includes sarongs, sunblock, and swimsuits. The indoor FlowRider artificial wave provides an opportunity to learn surfing, a sport difficult to practice on the Gulf of Mexico with its small waves.

References

External links
Surf Style website

Surfwear brands